Françoise Cartron (born 27 March 1949) is a member of the Senate of France, representing the Gironde department.  She is a member of the Socialist Party.

Before being elected as a member of the senate on 21 September 2008, Cartron was a primary school headteacher.  She is also the mayor of Artigues-près-Bordeaux, a vice-president of the Aquitaine Regional Council and of the Urban Community of Bordeaux.

References
Page on the Senate website

1949 births
Living people
Socialist Party (France) politicians
French Senators of the Fifth Republic
Women members of the Senate (France)
Women mayors of places in France
Senators of Gironde